Bessemer is an unincorporated community on U.S. Route 11 in Berkeley County, West Virginia, United States.

Unincorporated communities in Berkeley County, West Virginia
Unincorporated communities in West Virginia